La Torre de l'Espanyol is a municipality in the comarca of Ribera d'Ebre, Tarragona Province, Catalonia, Spain.

Its name originated in the donation of a municipal charter to a person named Espanyol or Espaniol, a name of Occitan origin, in 1175.

References

 Panareda Clopés, Josep Maria; Rios Calvet, Jaume; Rabella Vives, Josep Maria (1989). Guia de Catalunya, Barcelona: Caixa de Catalunya.  (Spanish).  (Catalan).

External links

La Torre de l'Espanyol Town Hall webpage
 Government data pages 

Municipalities in Ribera d'Ebre
Populated places in Ribera d'Ebre